The Detroit Tigers 2008 season was the team's 108th season in Major League Baseball's American League. After being picked by many to win the AL Central Division and the World Series, the Tigers started the season a disappointing 0–7 after being swept by the Kansas City Royals and Chicago White Sox. Their first victory of the season came against the Boston Red Sox. The Tigers did not reach a .500 winning percentage until their 80th game of the season.

Although they were eliminated from the pennant race by the season's final day (September 29), they nonetheless had to play a makeup game against the White Sox (who were trailing the Minnesota Twins by half a game), which Detroit had lost 8–2. The Tigers finished the season in last place in the AL Central, trailing the White Sox (who won the division by beating Minnesota in a one-game playoff the following day) by 14.5 games.

Despite the disappointing performance, the Tigers drew a franchise-record home attendance of 3,202,645 for the season. The team ranked third in the American League and eighth in Major League Baseball for home attendance in 2008.

Offseason

The Tigers started the offseason by trading prospects Jair Jurrjens and Gorkys Hernández to the Atlanta Braves for shortstop Édgar Rentería.  Rentería took over the everyday shortstop job with Carlos Guillén moving to first base.

Reliever Joel Zumaya underwent surgery on October 31, 2007 for an AC joint reconstruction and was expected to miss half the 2008 season.

The Tigers continued their offseason trading by acquiring Miguel Cabrera and Dontrelle Willis from the Florida Marlins in exchange for highly touted prospects Cameron Maybin and Andrew Miller, along with Mike Rabelo, Eulogio De La Cruz, Burke Badenhop and Dallas Trahern.  Willis would sign a three-year, $29 million contract extension, while Cabrera would receive an eight-year, $152.3 million deal, the biggest contract in Tigers history.

During the offseason, the Tigers traded Omar Infante to the Chicago Cubs for Jacque Jones. They re-signed Todd Jones, and Kenny Rogers to one-year contracts.  The Tigers also signed free agent Francisco Cruceta from the Texas Rangers organization to a one-year contract. Cruceta and Jacque Jones were eventually released during the season, and Todd Jones retired at the end of the season. The Tigers declined the option to sign Édgar Rentería at the end of the season.

Regular season

Season standings

Record vs. opponents

Game log

|- bgcolor="ffbbbb"
| 1 || March 31 || Royals || 5 – 4 (11)|| Núñez (1–0) || Bautista (0–1) || Soria (1) || 44,934 || 0–1
|-

|- bgcolor="ffbbbb"
| 2 || April 2 || Royals || 4–0 || Bannister (1–0) || Rogers (0–1) || || 32,348 || 0–2
|- bgcolor="ffbbbb"
| 3 || April 3 || Royals || 4–1 || Greinke (1–0) || Bonderman (0–1) || Soria (2) || 32,735 || 0–3
|- bgcolor="ffbbbb"
| 4 || April 4 || White Sox || 8–5 || Logan (1–0) || Grilli (0–1) || Jenks (2) || 34,569 || 0–4
|- bgcolor="ffbbbb"
| 5 || April 5 || White Sox || 5–3 || Floyd (1–0) || Miner (0–1) || Jenks (3) || 42,381 || 0–5
|- bgcolor="ffbbbb"
| 6 || April 6 || White Sox || 13–2 || Buehrle (1–0) || Verlander (0–1) || || 35,230 || 0–6
|- bgcolor="ffbbbb"
| 7 || April 8 || @ Red Sox || 5–0 || Matsuzaka (2–0) || Rogers (0–2) || || 36,567 || 0–7
|- bgcolor="bbffbb"
| 8 || April 9 || @ Red Sox || 7–2 || Bonderman (1–1) || Lester (1–2) || || 37,190 || 1–7
|- bgcolor="ffbbbb"
| 9 || April 10 || @ Red Sox || 12–6 || Wakefield (1–0) || Robertson (0–1) || Papelbon (3) || 37,612 || 1–8
|- bgcolor="bbffbb"
| 10 || April 11 || @ White Sox || 5–2 || López (1–0) || Contreras (0–1) || Jones (1) || 26,094 || 2–8
|- bgcolor="ffbbbb"
| 11 || April 12 || @ White Sox || 7–0 || Floyd (2–0) || Verlander (0–2) || || 29,649 || 2–9
|- bgcolor="ffbbbb"
| 12 || April 13 || @ White Sox || 11–0 || Vázquez (2–1) || Rogers (0–3) || || 26,294 || 2–10
|- bgcolor="bbffbb"
| 13 || April 14 || Twins || 11–9 || Beltrán (1–0) || Neskek (0–1) || Jones (2) || 32,002 || 3–10
|- bgcolor="bbffbb"
| 14 || April 15 || Twins || 6–5 || Rapada (1–0) || Crain (0–1) || Jones (3) || 30,901 || 4–10
|- bgcolor="bbffbb"
| 15 || April 16 || @ Indians || 13–2 || Galarraga (1–0) || Sabathia (0–3) || || 17,644 || 5–10
|- bgcolor="ffbbbb"
| 16 || April 17 || @ Indians || 11–1 || Carmona (2–1) || Verlander (0–3) || || 21,547 || 5–11
|- bgcolor="bbffbb"
| 17 || April 18 || @ Blue Jays || 8–4 || Rogers (1–3) || Accardo (0–3) || || 24,294 || 6–11
|- bgcolor="ffbbbb"
| 18 || April 19 || @ Blue Jays || 3–2 || McGowan (1–1) || Bonderman (1–2) || Ryan (2) || 31,052 || 6–12
|- bgcolor="ffbbbb"
| 19 || April 20 || @ Blue Jays || 5–3 || Burnett (2–1) || Robertson (0–2) || Accardo (4) || 30,139 || 6–13
|- bgcolor="bbffbb"
| 20 || April 21 || @ Blue Jays || 5–1 || Galarraga (2–0) || Marcum (2–1) || || 25,287 || 7–13
|- bgcolor="bbffbb"
| 21 || April 22 || Rangers || 10–2 || Verlander (1–3) || Padilla (2–2) || || 33,629 || 8–13
|- bgcolor="bbffbb"
| 22 || April 23 || Rangers || 19–6 || Rapada (2–0) || Francisco (0–1) || || 34,245 || 9–13
|- bgcolor="bbffbb"
| 23 || April 24 || Rangers || 8–2 || Miner (1–1) || Jennings (0–4) || || 39,058 || 10–13
|- bgcolor="ffbbbb"
| 24 || April 25 || Angels || 4–3 || Santana (4–0) || Robertson (0–3) || Rodríguez (10) || 40,380 || 10–14
|- bgcolor="bbffbb"
| 25 || April 26 || Angels || 6–4 || López (2–0) || O'Day (0–1) || Jones (4) || 42,068 || 11–14
|- bgcolor="ffbbbb"
| 26 || April 27 || Angels || 6–2 || Weaver (2–3) || Verlander (1–4) || || 36,347 || 11–15
|- bgcolor="bbffbb"
| 27 || April 29 || @ Yankees || 6–4 || Rogers (2–3) || Hughes (0–4) || Jones (5) || 49,194 || 12–15
|- bgcolor="bbffbb"
| 28 || April 30 || @ Yankees || 6–2 || Bonderman (2–2) || Pettitte (3–3) || || 49,513 || 13–15
|-

|- bgcolor="bbffbb" 
| 29 || May 1 || @ Yankees || 8–4 || Robertson (1–3) || Albaladejo (0–1) || || 50,993 || 14–15
|- bgcolor="ffbbbb"
| 30 || May 2 || @ Twins || 11–1 || Hernández (4–1) || Galarraga (2–1) || || 33,628 || 14–16
|- bgcolor="ffbbbb"
| 31 || May 3 || @ Twins || 4–1 || Bass (1–0) || Verlander (1–5) || Nathan (10) || 28,985 || 14–17
|- bgcolor="ffbbbb"
| 32 || May 4 || @ Twins || 7–6 || Guerrier (2–1) || Miner (1–2) || Nathan (11) || 29,821 || 14–18
|- bgcolor="ffbbbb"
| 33 || May 5 || Red Sox || 6–3 || Matsuzaka (5–0) || Bonderman (2–3) || Papelbon (10) || 39,478 || 14–19
|- bgcolor="ffbbbb"
| 34 || May 6 || Red Sox || 5–0 || Wakefield (3–1) || Robertson (1–4) || || 38,564 || 14–20
|- bgcolor="bbffbb"  
| 35 || May 7 || Red Sox || 10–9 || Jones (1–0) || Papelbon (2–1) || || 38,062 || 15–20
|- bgcolor="ffbbbb"
| 36 || May 8 || Red Sox || 5–1 || Beckett (4–2) || Verlander (1–6) || || 38,952 || 15–21
|- bgcolor="bbffbb"
| 37 || May 9 || Yankees || 6–5 || Rogers (3–3) || Igawa (0–1) || || 44,062 || 16–21
|- bgcolor="ffbbbb"
| 38 || May 10 || Yankees || 5–2 || Rasner (2–0) || Bonderman (2–4) || Rivera (10) || 44,580 || 16–22
|- bgcolor="bbbbbb"
| – || May 11 || Yankees || colspan=6 | Postponed (rain) – Rescheduled for September 1
|- bgcolor="ffbbbb"
| 39 || May 13 || @ Royals || 3–2 || Núñez (3–0) || Cruceta (0–1) || Soria (9) || 11,703 || 16–23
|- bgcolor="ffbbbb"
| 40 || May 14 || @ Royals || 2–0 || Hochevar (3–2) || Verlander (1–7) || Soria (10) || 14,053 || 16–24
|- bgcolor="ffbbbb"
| 41 || May 15 || @ Royals || 8–4 || Meche (3–5) || Rogers (3–4) || || 34,734 || 16–25
|- bgcolor="ffbbbb"
| 42 || May 16 || @ D-backs || 4–3 || Haren (5–2) || Miner (1–3) || Peña (1) || 33,531 || 16–26
|- bgcolor="bbffbb"
| 43 || May 17 || @ D-backs || 3–2 || Galarraga (3–1) || Scherzer (0–2) || Jones (6) || 48,804 || 17–26
|- bgcolor="ffbbbb"
| 44 || May 18 || @ D-backs || 4–0 || Johnson (4–1) || Robertson (1–4) || || 38,793 || 17–27
|- bgcolor="bbffbb"
| 45 || May 20 || Mariners || 12–8 || Verlander (2–7) || Silva (3–3) || Jones (7) || 39,463 || 18–27
|- bgcolor="bbffbb"
| 46 || May 21 || Mariners || 9–4 || Rogers (4–4) || Washburn (2–6) || || 36,495 || 19–27
|- bgcolor="bbffbb"
| 47 || May 22 || Mariners || 9–2 || Bonderman (3–4) || Batista (3–6) || Dolsi (1) || 40,166 || 20–27
|- bgcolor="ffbbbb"
| 48 || May 23 || Twins || 9–4 || Slowey (1–4) || Galarraga (3–2) || || 40,732 || 20–28
|- bgcolor="bbffbb"
| 49 || May 24 || Twins || 19–3 || Robertson (2–4) || Bonser (2–6) || || 41,137 || 21–28
|- bgcolor="ffbbbb"
| 50 || May 25 || Twins || 6–1 || Perkins (2–1) || Cruceta (0–2) || || 42,413 || 21–29
|- bgcolor="ffbbbb"
| 51 || May 26 || @ Angels || 1–0 || Arredondo (1–0) || Dolsi (0–1) || || 41,031 || 21–30
|- bgcolor="ffbbbb"
| 52 || May 27 || @ Angels || 3–2 || Santana (7–2) || López (2–1) || || 36,569 || 21–31
|- bgcolor="bbffbb"
| 53 || May 28 || @ Angels || 6–2 || Galarraga (4–2) || Saunders (8–2) || || 42,191 || 22–31
|- bgcolor="bbffbb"
| 54 || May 30 || @ Mariners || 7–4 || Robertson (3–5) || Silva (3–5) || Jones (8) || 34,019 || 23–31
|- bgcolor="ffbbbb"
| 55 || May 31 || @ Mariners || 5–0 || Hernández (3–5) || Verlander  (2–8) || || 33,441 || 23–32
|-

|- bgcolor="bbffbb"
| 56 || June 1 || @ Mariners || 7–5 || Miner (2–3) || Putz (2–3) || || 38,610 || 24–32
|- bgcolor="ffbbbb"
| 57 || June 2 || @ Athletics || 3–2 || Street (1–1) || Cruceta (0–3) || || 11,772 || 24–33
|- bgcolor="ffbbbb"
| 58 || June 3 || @ Athletics || 5–4 || Gaudin (5–3) || Seay (0–1) || || 10,871 || 24–34
|- bgcolor="ffbbbb"
| 59 || June 4 || @ Athletics || 10–2 || Duchscherer (5–4) || Robertson (3–6) || || 19,258 || 24–35
|- bgcolor="ffbbbb"
| 60 || June 6 || Indians || 4–2 || Byrd (3–5) || Verlander (2–9) || Borowski (5) || 40,990 || 24–36
|- bgcolor="bbffbb"
| 61 || June 7 || Indians || 8–4 || Miner (3–3) || Kobayashi (3–3) || Jones (9) || 42,193 || 25–36
|- bgcolor="bbffbb"
| 62 || June 8 || Indians || 5–2 || Galarraga (5–2) || Sowers (0–1) || Jones (10) || 39,941 || 26–36
|- bgcolor="ffbbbb"
| 63 || June 9 || Indians || 8–2 || Lee (10–1) || Willis (0–1) || || 38,440 || 26–37
|- bgcolor="bbffbb"
| 64 || June 10 || White Sox || 6–4 || Robertson (4–6) || Contreras (6–4) || Jones (11) || 38,295 || 27–37
|- bgcolor="bbffbb"
| 65 || June 11 || White Sox || 4–1 || Verlander (3–9) || Vázquez (6–5) || || 38,693 || 28–37
|- bgcolor="bbffbb"
| 66 || June 12 || White Sox || 2–1 || Jones (2–0) || Dotel (3–3) || || 40,297 || 29–37
|- bgcolor="bbffbb"
| 67 || June 13 || Dodgers || 5–0 || Galarraga (6–2) || Lowe (4–6) || Dolsi (2) || 40,430 || 30–37
|- bgcolor="bbffbb"
| 68 || June 14 || Dodgers || 12–7 || Bonine (1–0) || Penny (5–9) || || 42,348 || 31–37
|- bgcolor="bbffbb"
| 69 || June 15 || Dodgers || 5–4 || Robertson (5–6) || Park (2–2) || Jones (12) || 41,189 || 32–37
|- bgcolor="ffbbbb"
| 70 || June 16 || @ Giants || 8–6 || Yabu (3–3) || Dolsi (0–2) || || 33,317 || 32–38
|- bgcolor="bbffbb"
| 71 || June 17 || @ Giants || 5–1 || Rogers (5–4) || Sánchez (6–4) || || 33,636 || 33–38
|- bgcolor="bbffbb"
| 72 || June 18 || @ Giants || 7–2 || Galarraga (7–2) || Zito (2–11) || || 38,194 || 34–38
|- bgcolor="ffbbbb"
| 73 || June 20 || @ Padres || 6–2 || Bell (5–3) || Rodney (0–1) || || 40,683 || 34–39
|- bgcolor="bbffbb"
| 74 || June 21 || @ Padres || 7–5 || Robertson (6–6) || Baek (1–2) || Jones (13) || 34,749 || 35–39
|- bgcolor="bbffbb"
| 75 || June 22 || @ Padres || 5–3 || Verlander (4–9) || Wolf (5–6) || Jones (14) || 28,779 || 36–39
|- bgcolor="ffbbbb"
| 76 || June 24 || Cardinals || 8–4 || Looper (9–5) || Rogers (5–5) || || 44,446 || 36–40
|- bgcolor="bbffbb"
| 77 || June 25 || Cardinals || 8–7 || Jones (3–0) || McClellan (0–3) || || 40,091 || 37–40
|- bgcolor="bbffbb"
| 78 || June 26 || Cardinals || 3–2 || Seay (1–1) || Parisi (0–4) || || 41,022 || 38–40
|- bgcolor="bbffbb"
| 79 || June 27 || Rockies || 7–1 || Bonine (2–0) || Jiménez (2–8) || || 40,842 || 39–40
|- bgcolor="bbffbb"
| 80 || June 28 || Rockies || 7–6 || Dolsi (1–2) || Fuentes (1–3) || || 42,729 || 40–40
|- bgcolor="bbffbb"
| 81 || June 29 || Rockies || 4–3 || Rogers (6–5) || Reynolds (2–6) || Jones (15) || 41,305 || 41–40
|- bgcolor="bbffbb"
| 82 || June 30 || @ Twins || 5–4 || Fossum (1–0) || Guerrier (4–3) || Zumaya (1) || 22,196 || 42–40
|-

|- bgcolor="ffbbbb"
| 83 || July 1 || @ Twins || 6–4 || Baker (5–2) || Robertson (6–7) || Nathan (23) || 23,754 || 42–41
|- bgcolor="ffbbbb"
| 84 || July 2 || @ Twins || 7–0 || Blackburn (7–4) || Bonine (2–1) || || 30,102 || 42–42
|- bgcolor="bbffbb"
| 85 || July 3 || @ Mariners || 8–4 || Verlander (5–9) || Silva (4–10) || Rodney (1) || 22,523 || 43–42
|- bgcolor="ffbbbb"
| 86 || July 4 || @ Mariners || 4–1 || Bédard (6–4) || Rogers (6–6) || Morrow (6) || 30,564 || 43–43
|- bgcolor="ffbbbb"
| 87 || July 5 || @ Mariners || 3–2 || Batista (4–10) || Rodney (0–2) || Morrow (7) || 30,373 || 43–44
|- bgcolor="bbffbb"
| 88 || July 6 || @ Mariners || 2 – 1 (15)|| López (3–1) || Burke (0–1) || Jones (16) || 29,083 || 44–44
|- bgcolor="bbffbb"
| 89 || July 8 || Indians || 9–2 || Verlander (6–9) || Sowers (0–5) || || 40,443 || 45–44
|- bgcolor="bbffbb"
| 90 || July 9 || Indians || 8–6 || Jones (4–0) || Lewis (0–3) || || 41,062 || 46–44
|- bgcolor="ffbbbb"
| 91 || July 10 || Twins || 7 – 6 (11) || Guerrier (5–4)|| Dolsi (1–3) || || 41,952 || 46–45
|- bgcolor="ffbbbb"
| 92 || July 11 || Twins || 3–2 || Perkins (6–2) || Galarraga (7–3) || Nathan (26) || 42,352 || 46–46
|- bgcolor="ffbbbb"
| 93 || July 12 || Twins || 6–5 || Baker (6–2) || Robertson (6–8) || Nathan (27) || 41,301 || 46–47
|- bgcolor="bbffbb"
| 94 || July 13 || Twins || 4–2 || Verlander (7–9) || Blackburn (7–5)|| Jones (17) || 41,453 || 47–47
|- bgcolor="bbffbb"
| 95 || July 17 || @ Orioles || 6–5 || Rogers (7–6) || Olson (6–5) || Jones (18) || 23,224 || 48–47
|- bgcolor="ffbbbb"
| 96 || July 18 || @ Orioles || 7–4 || Guthrie (6–7) || Galarraga (7–4) || Sherrill (29) || 29,111 || 48–48
|- bgcolor="ffbbbb"
| 97 || July 19 || @ Orioles || 11 – 10 (10) || Sherrill (3–4) || Dolsi (1–4) || || 31,525 || 48–49
|- bgcolor="bbffbb"
| 98 || July 20 || @ Orioles || 5–1 || Verlander (8–9) || Burres (7–6) || || 23,278 || 49–49
|- bgcolor="bbffbb"
| 99 || July 21 || @ Royals || 19–4 || Miner (4–3) || Hochevar (6–8) || || 14,137 || 50–49
|- bgcolor="bbffbb"
| 100 || July 22 || @ Royals || 7–1 || Rogers (8–6) || Davies (3–2) || || 22,074 || 51–49
|- bgcolor="bbffbb"
| 101 || July 23 || @ Royals || 7–1 || Galarraga (8–4) || Greinke (7–7) || || 16,594 || 52–49
|- bgcolor="ffbbbb"
| 102 || July 25 || White Sox || 6–5 || Carrasco (1–0) || Jones (4–1) || Jenks (20) || 44,393 || 52–50
|- bgcolor="ffbbbb"
| 103 || July 26 || White Sox || 7–6 || Danks (8–4) || Verlander (8–10) || Jenks (21) || 45,280 || 52–51
|- bgcolor="bbffbb"
| 104 || July 27 || White Sox || 6–4 || Miner (5–3) || Vázquez (7–9) || || 41,790 || 53–51
|- bgcolor="ffbbbb"
| 105 || July 28 || @ Indians || 5–0 || Byrd (5–10) || Rogers (8–7) || || 24,689 || 53–52
|- bgcolor="bbffbb"
| 106 || July 29 || @ Indians || 8–5 || Galarraga (9–4) || Ginter (1–2) || || 30,625 || 54–52
|- bgcolor="bbffbb"
| 107 || July 30 || @ Indians || 14–12 || Fossum (2–0) || Rincón (2–3) || || 26,596 || 55–52
|- bgcolor="ffbbbb"
| 108 || July 31 || @ Indians || 9–4 || Carmona (5–3) || Verlander (8–11) || || 34,186 || 55–53
|-

|- bgcolor="ffbbbb"
| 109 || August 1 || @ Rays || 5–2 || Balfour (3–1) || Miner (5–4) || Percival (24) || 26,403 || 55–54
|- bgcolor="ffbbbb"
| 110 || August 2 || @ Rays || 9–3 || Sonnanstine (11–6) || Rogers (8–8) ||  || 36,048 || 55–55
|- bgcolor="ffbbbb"
| 111 || August 3 || @ Rays || 6 – 5 (10) || Miller (1–0) || Rodney (0–3) ||  || 33,438 || 55–56
|- bgcolor="ffbbbb"
| 112 || August 5 || @ White Sox || 10 – 8 (14) || Russell (4–0) || Zumaya (0–1) || || 35,371 || 55–57
|- bgcolor="ffbbbb"
| 113 || August 6 || @ White Sox || 5–1 || Danks (9–4) || Verlander (8–12) || || 34,124 || 55–58
|- bgcolor="bbffbb"
| 114 || August 7 || @ White Sox || 8–3 || Miner (6–4) || Vázquez (8–10) || Rodney (2) || 36,383 || 56–58
|- bgcolor="ffbbbb"
| 115 || August 8 || Athletics || 4–2 || Braden (3–2) ||  Rogers (8–9)  || Ziegler (1) || 41,457 || 56–59
|- bgcolor="bbffbb"
| 116 || August 9 || Athletics || 10–2 || Galarraga (10–4) || Meyer (0–1) || || 41,308 || 57–59
|- bgcolor="bbffbb"  
| 117 || August 10 || Athletics || 6–1 || Robertson (7–8) || Smith (5–11) || Rodney (3) || 40,743 || 58–59
|- bgcolor="ffbbbb" 
| 118 || August 11 || Blue Jays || 7–2 || Marcum (7–5) || Verlander (8–13) || || 39,718 || 58–60
|- bgcolor="ffbbbb" 
| 119 || August 12 || Blue Jays || 6–4 || Burnett (15–9) || Zumaya (0–2) || Ryan (23) || 39,790 || 58–61
|- bgcolor="ffbbbb"
| 120 || August 13 || Blue Jays || 4–3 || Purcey (2–3) || Rogers (8–10) || League (1) || 39,073 || 58–62
|- bgcolor="bbffbb"  
| 121 || August 14 || Blue Jays || 5–1 || Galarraga (11–4) || Frasor (1–2) || || 41,259 || 59–62
|- bgcolor="ffbbbb" 
| 122 || August 15 || Orioles || 11–2 ||Cormier (2–3)||Robertson (7–9)|| ||40,546||59–63
|- bgcolor="bbffbb" 
| 123 || August 16 || Orioles || 5–3 ||Verlander (9–13)||Sarfate (4–3)||Rodney (4)||41,727||60–63
|- bgcolor="ffbbbb" 
| 124 || August 17 || Orioles || 16–8 ||Cabrera (2–1)||Fossum (2–1)|| ||40,586||60–64
|- bgcolor="bbffbb" 
| 125 || August 18 || @ Rangers || 8–7 || Rogers (9–10) || Francisco (2–5) || Rodney (5) || 17,786 || 61–64
|- bgcolor="bbffbb" 
| 126 || August 19 || @ Rangers || 11–3 || Galarraga (12–4) || Padilla (12–7) || || 18,470 || 62–64
|- bgcolor="ffbbbb" 
| 127 || August 20 || @ Rangers || 9–1 || Millwood (7–7) || Robertson (7–10) || || 19,403 || 62–65
|- bgcolor="bbffbb" 
| 128 || August 22 || @ Royals || 4–3 || Verlander (10–13) || Bannister (7–13) || Rodney (6) || 18,361 || 63–65
|- bgcolor="bbffbb" 
| 129 || August 23 || @ Royals || 4–0 || Miner (7–4) || Davies (5–5) || || 27,346 || 64–65
|- bgcolor="ffbbbb"
| 130 || August 24 || @ Royals || 7–3 || Duckworth (1–0) || Rogers (9–11) || || 16,663 || 64–66
|- bgcolor="ffbbbb"
| 131 || August 25 || Indians || 4 – 3 (10) || Donnelly (1–0) || Glover (1–3) || Lewis (7) || 39,196 || 64–67
|- bgcolor="ffbbbb"
| 132 || August 26 || Indians || 10–4 || Lee (19–2) || Lambert (0–1) || || 38,774 || 64–68
|- bgcolor="ffbbbb"
| 133 || August 27 || Indians || 9–7 || Carmona (7–5) || Verlander (10–14) || || 38,519 || 64–69
|- bgcolor="bbffbb"
| 134 || August 29 || Royals || 6–3 || Miner (8–4) || Davies (5–6) || || 40,206 || 65–69
|- bgcolor="ffbbbb"
| 135 || August 30 || Royals || 13–3 || Duckworth (2–0) || Rogers (9–12) || || 40,623 || 65–70
|- bgcolor="bbffbb"
| 136 || August 31 || Royals || 4–2 || Glover (2–3) || Wells (0–1) || Rodney (7) || 39,782 || 66–70
|-

|- bgcolor="ffbbbb"
| 137 || September 1 || Yankees || 13–9 || Bruney (2–0) || Verlander (10–15) || || 44,336 || 66–71
|- bgcolor="ffbbbb"
| 138 || September 2 || Angels || 5–4 || Shields (6–4) || Rodney (0–4) || Rodríguez (54) || 35,320 || 66–72
|- bgcolor="bbffbb"
| 139 || September 3 || Angels || 9–6 || Farnsworth (2–2) || Arredondo (7–2) || Rodney (8) || 36,671 || 67–72
|- bgcolor="ffbbbb"
| 140 || September 4 || Angels || 7–1 || Santana (15–5) || Rogers (9–13) || || 37,890 || 67–73
|- bgcolor="ffbbbb"
| 141 || September 5 || @ Twins || 10–2 || Liriano (5–3) || Galarraga (12–5) || || 24,424 || 67–74
|- bgcolor="bbffbb"
| 142 || September 6 || @ Twins || 6–4 || Rapada (3–0) || Guerrier (6–7) || Rodney (9) || 42,606 || 68–74
|- bgcolor="bbffbb"
| 143 || September 7 || @ Twins || 7–5 || Lambert (1–1) || Perkins (12–4) || Rodney (10) || 31,236 || 69–74
|- bgcolor="bbffbb"
| 144 || September 8 || Athletics || 14–8 || Fossum (3–1) || Gonzalez (1–4) || || 37,981 || 70–74
|- bgcolor="ffbbbb"
| 145 || September 9 || Athletics || 3–2 || Devine (5–1) || Rodney (0–5) || Ziegler (7) || 37,240 || 70–75
|- bgcolor="ffbbbb"
| 146 || September 10 || Athletics || 5–2 || Street (6–5) || Galarraga (12–6) || Ziegler (8) || 37,194 || 70–76
|- bgcolor="bbbbbb"
| – || September 12 || @ White Sox || colspan=8 | Postponed (rain) Rescheduled for September 13
|- bgcolor="bbbbbb"
| – || September 13 || @ White Sox || colspan=8 | Postponed (rain) Rescheduled for September 14
|- bgcolor="bbbbbb"
| – || September 13 || @ White Sox || colspan=8 | Postponed (rain) Rescheduled for September 29
|- bgcolor="ffbbbb"
| 147 || September 14 || @ White Sox || 4–2 || Vázquez (12–13) || Verlander (10–16) || || N/A || 70–77
|- bgcolor="ffbbbb"
| 148 || September 14 || @ White Sox ||  11–7 || Thornton (5–3) || Seay (1–2) || || 28,238 || 70–78
|- bgcolor="ffbbbb"
| 149 || September 15 || @ Rangers ||  11–8 || Francisco (3–5) || Farnsworth (2–3) || || 13,536 || 70–79
|- bgcolor="ffbbbb"
| 150 || September 16 || @ Rangers || 5–4 || Wright (7–6) || Rodney (0–6) || || 14,659 || 70–80
|- bgcolor="bbffbb"
| 151 || September 17 || @ Rangers || 17–4 || García (1–0) || Nippert (3–5) || || 17,808 || 71–80
|- bgcolor="ffbbbb"
| 152 || September 19 || @ Indians || 6–5 || Perez (4–3) || Dolsi (1–5) || || 33,733 || 71–81
|- bgcolor="ffbbbb"
| 153 || September 20 || @ Indians || 6–3 || Sowers (4–8) || Verlander (10–17) || Lewis (11) || 36,869 || 71–82
|- bgcolor="ffbbbb"
| 154 || September 21 || @ Indians || 10–5 || Lewis (3–0) || Willis (0–2) || || 36,957 || 71–83
|- bgcolor="ffbbbb"
| 155 || September 22 || Royals || 6–2 || Meche (13–11) || Miner (8–5) || || 36,428 || 71–84
|- bgcolor="ffbbbb"
| 156 || September 23 || Royals || 5–0 || Greinke (13–10) || García (1–1) ||  || 35,121 || 71–85
|- bgcolor="ffbbbb"
| 157 || September 24 || Royals || 10–4 || Bannister (9–16) || Robertson (7–11) || || 35,899 || 71–86
|- bgcolor="bbffbb"
| 158 || September 25 || Rays || 7–5 || Galarraga (13–6) || Kazmir (12–8) || Rodney (11) || 36,259 || 72–86
|- bgcolor="bbffbb"
| 159 || September 26 || Rays || 6–4 || Verlander (11–17) || Sonnanstine (13–9) || Rodney (12) || 39,617 || 73–86
|- bgcolor="bbffbb"
| 160 || September 27 || Rays || 4–3 || López (4–1) || Niemann (2–2) || Rodney (13) || 40,756 || 74–86
|- bgcolor="ffbbbb"
| 161 || September 28 || Rays || 8 – 7 (11) || Jackson (14–11) || Lambert (1–2) || Hammel (2) || 40,373 || 74–87
|- bgcolor="ffbbbb"
| 162 || September 29 || @ White Sox || 8–2 || Floyd (17–8) || Galarraga (13–7) || || 35,923 || 74–88 
|-

Player stats

Batting
Note: Pos. = Position; G = Games played; AB = At bats; H = Hits; Avg. = Batting average; HR = Home runs; RBI = Runs batted in

Note: Pitchers' batting statistics not included

Starting pitchers

Relief pitchers 

* Statistics only include games with Tigers

Roster

Farm system

External links

 Detroit Tigers season at Baseball Reference

References

Detroit Tigers seasons
Detroit Tigers
Detroit
2008 in Detroit